Eriosema is a genus of legume in the family Fabaceae. 
Accepted species number over 150. The genus is widespread in tropics.

Description
Species of Eriosema are mostly herbs or shrublets. Leaves are pinnately 3-foliolate, rarely reduced to a single leaflet. Inflorescences are 1–2-flowered or pedunculate racemes in the leaf axils, yellow to orange, calyx is campanulate, consists of five similar lobes. Pods are short and flattened with two seeds.

Selected species

 Eriosema campestre Benth. — Argentina,  Paraguay, Brazil
 Eriosema chinense Vogel — South-East Asia, East Himalaya, India, New Guinea, Australia 
 Eriosema defoliatum Benth. — Brazil
 Eriosema glabrum Mart. ex Benth. — Argentina, Brazil
 Eriosema glaziovii Harms — Brazil
 Eriosema harmsianum Dinter — Namibia
 Eriosema kraussianum Meisn. — South Africa
 Eriosema longifolium Benth. — Brazil, Bolivia, Colombia, Paraguay  
 Eriosema salignum E.Mey. — South Africa
 Eriosema stenophyllum Harms — Brazil

Uses
Root tubers of Eriosema species have been traditional food for Aborigines of the Northern Territory.

References

Phaseoleae
Fabaceae genera
Taxa named by Augustin Pyramus de Candolle
Taxonomy articles created by Polbot